Cystiscus punctatus is a species of very small sea snail, a marine gastropod mollusk or micromollusk in the family Cystiscidae.

Description 
The size of the shell attains 1.5 mm.

Distribution 
This marine species occurs off New Caledonia

References 

Cystiscidae
Gastropods described in 2003
Punctatus